Animal Talking: The Adventures of Gary Whitta was a web television virtual talk show hosted by Gary Whitta on Twitch and executive produced by Leah Whitta. The show was livestreamed entirely from a talk show set built in Animal Crossing: New Horizons. Animal Talking premiered on April 25, 2020. It featured Adam Nickerson as the bandleader.

Background 
Amidst the COVID-19 pandemic, Gary Whitta began streaming himself playing Animal Crossing: New Horizons daily a month before Animal Talking began, in the form of Animal Crossing Mornings. The show helped the channel gain a growing audience and identity. During his playthrough, Whitta came up with an idea to create a talk show set that paid homage to his favorite shows of the genre, such as The Tonight Show, The Larry Sanders Show, and Between Two Ferns. A pilot episode was livestreamed in the set on April 25 with his friend and internet personality Naomi Kyle, which was well regarded by viewers. The show would later produce four more shows that week, before settling into a Monday, Wednesday, Friday schedule, with a permanent schedule at 7PM PT every Wednesday starting from episode 16.

In December 2020, during one of his Animal Crossing Mornings Twitch streams, Whitta announced he had no plans for new Animal Talking episodes in the foreseeable future by revealing he had redesigned the basement of his Animal Crossing home, where the Animal Talking set had been constructed. Whitta cited anxiety and stress around organizing the show on a weekly basis as his main reason for ending the show.

Production 
The show was filmed in Animal Crossing: New Horizons on Gary's island of Kawaii. The set was put together with in-game furniture created by or gifted to the Whittas by viewers of the show. The in-game camera was used to film the show, although its limitations required the host avatar to move for better angles. Guests appeared on the show as Animal Crossing avatars, with the wardrobe supervised by Twitch streamer Kate Stark. On the occasion that a guest did not play Animal Crossing, executive producer and Gary's wife Leah Whitta customized her own avatar to match the appearance of the guest and puppeteered them live as they spoke. The production and guests spoke together through Discord.

Additional staff members included Adam Nickerson, who served as band leader and edited full episodes into ten minute highlight videos for the show's YouTube channel. The logo was designed by Chandana Ekanayake with Leah Whitta. The theme song was composed by Kenny Fong, and also credits Tom Young, Cameron Rose, Chris Petty, Desmond Splitter, Christian Lucy, and K.K. Slider.

Due to the show's viral success, the show was approached by potential sponsors, cable television networks, and advertisers. However, Whitta rejected these opportunities, citing disinterest and stating, "As soon as it becomes cynical, monetized, or corporatized, I think the whimsy and authenticity of it will disappear."

Format
The show functioned similarly to its real-life counterparts. Each episode started with an opening sequence featuring Whitta's avatar performing various activities around his island, while Snowbike Mike announced that episode's guests. The theme song played in the background as Mike introduced Gary Whitta as the host, who greeted the audience, conversed with Nickerson, and delivered any news about the show.

Following the introduction, main segments included celebrity interviews, live musical performances, and stand-up comedy. While interviews dived into the life of the guests, much of the conversation revolved around gaming and Animal Crossing. At the end of the show, each guest was invited to step up to a mic to deliver a joke, and the best joke among the guests was determined through chat poll votes from the live audience.

A segment Danny's Diary featuring Danny Trejo first aired its debut episode on 8 June. The first episode followed Trejo's avatar giving Nickerson a tour of his own island.

Episodes

Season 1

Season 2

Reception 
The show was well received by viewers. Animal Talking was featured on the Twitch homepage, with its fourth episode reaching over 12,000 viewers, reaching number 14 on the site's most watched streams that day. Episode 10 pulled in a total of 339,000 individual viewers, while Episode 11 reached 18,000 concurrent viewers, a record for the show.

The Verge proclaimed Animal Talking as "2020's Hottest Late-Night Talk Show." Touching on the uniqueness of the concept, Megan Farokhmanesh highlighted the pros of the show taking place in the video game: "On any other talk show, it would be an agonizing minute and a half of mistakes. Here, it's what makes Animal Talking so special." Screen Rants Christopher Teuton commented that "while most (...) traditional late-night talk show hosts are currently filming (...) and holding interviews over live chat services like Zoom, it's refreshing and unique to see the same format translated so perfectly here inside of Animal Crossing: New Horizons." He praised Whitta's skill as an interviewer and host, saying, "his conversations with Hollywood celebrities, musical geniuses, and video game enthusiasts are almost always just as enjoyable as those of his professional late night show counterparts, if not more so."

References

Further reading

External links 
 Animal Talking on Twitch
 Animal Talking on YouTube

2020s American late-night television series
2020 American television series debuts
2020s American variety television series
American non-fiction web series
Animal Crossing
English-language television shows
2020 web series debuts